Arthur MacMurrough Kavanagh (25 March 183125 December 1889) was an Irish politician. His middle name is spelled MacMorrough in some contemporaneous sources.

Biography
Arthur MacMurrough Kavanagh was born on 25 March 1831 at Borris House in County Carlow, the son of Thomas Kavanagh MP and artist Lady Harriet Margaret Le Poer Trench, daughter of the second Earl of Clancarty. His father traced his lineage to the medieval Kings of Leinster through Art MacMurrough-Kavanagh. He had two older brothers Charles and Thomas, and one sister, Harriet or "Hoddy." Arthur Kavanagh was born with only the rudiments of arms and legs, though the cause of this birth defect is unknown.

His mother insisted that he be brought up and have opportunities like any other child and placed him in the care of the doctor Francis Boxwell, who believed that an armless and legless child could live a productive life. Kavanagh learnt to ride horses at the age of three by being strapped to a special saddle and managing the horse with the stumps of his arms. With the help of the surgeon Sir Philip Crampton, Lady Harriet had a mechanical wheelchair constructed for her son, and encouraged him to ride horses and engage in other outdoor activities. He also went fishing, hunted animals, drew pictures, and wrote stories, with mechanical devices supplementing his physical capacities. His mother taught him how to write and paint holding pens and brushes in his mouth.

In 1846, Lady Harriet took three of her children, Thomas, Harriet and Arthur, travelling to the Middle East for two years. Arthur Kavanagh nearly drowned in the Nile when he fell in whilst fishing and was rescued by a local antiquities salesman who dived in to pull him out.

In 1849, Kavanagh's mother discovered that he had been having affairs with girls on the family estate, so she sent him into exile to Uppsala, and then to Moscow with his brother and a reverend, whom he came to hate. He travelled extensively in Egypt, Anatolia, Persia, and India between 1846 and 1853; in India, his letter of credit from his mother was cancelled when she discovered that he had spent two weeks in a harem, so he persuaded the East India Company to hire him as a despatch rider. Other sources say that this was due to the death of his eldest brother Charles of consumption in December 1851, which left him with only 30 shillings.

In 1851 Kavanagh succeeded to the family estates and to the title of The MacMurrough following the death of his older brother Thomas. He served as High Sheriff of County Kilkenny for 1856 and High Sheriff of Carlow for 1857. A Conservative and a Protestant, he sat in Parliament for County Wexford from 1866 to 1868, and for County Carlow from 1868 to 1880. On being elected, he had to be placed on the Tory benches by his manservant; the Speaker, Evelyn Denison, gave a special dispensation to allow the manservant to stay in the chamber during sittings. Kavanagh was opposed to the disestablishment of the (Anglican) Church of Ireland, but supported the Landlord and Tenant (Ireland) Act 1870. On losing his seat in 1880, William Ewart Gladstone appointed him to the Bessborough Commission, but he disagreed with its conclusions and published his own dissenting report. In 1886, he was made a member of the Privy Council of Ireland.

Kavanagh died of pneumonia on 25 December 1889 in London, and was buried in Ballicopagan cemetery. He was succeeded in the title of the MacMurrough by his son, Walter MacMurrough Kavanagh, who also served as MP for County Carlow from 1908 to 1910. The 1901 novel The History of Sir Richard Calmady, written by Lucas Malet (pseudonym of Mary St Leger Kingsley), is based on his life.

Family
Kavanagh married his cousin, Mary Frances Forde-Leathley, in 1855. Assisted by his wife, he was a philanthropic landlord, active county magistrate, and chairman of the board of guardians. Together, they had seven children:

 Eva (died 1896)
 May (died 1949)
 Agnes (died 1932)
 Walter (died 1922)
 Arthur (died 1882)
 Charles (died 1950)
 Osborne (died 1897)

References

External links
 
 Arthur MacMurrough Kavanagh : 1831–1889
 
Kavanagh on 'The Long Riders' Guild'
 'Disability history month: Arthur MacMorrough Kavanagh' on BBC News
Arthur MacMurrough Kavanagh at BBC Arts

1831 births
1889 deaths
People from County Carlow
Lord-Lieutenants of Carlow
British politicians with disabilities
Members of the Privy Council of Ireland
Members of the Parliament of the United Kingdom for County Carlow constituencies (1801–1922)
Members of the Parliament of the United Kingdom for County Wexford constituencies (1801–1922)
UK MPs 1865–1868
UK MPs 1868–1874
UK MPs 1874–1880
Irish Conservative Party MPs
MacMorrough Kavanagh dynasty
High Sheriffs of County Kilkenny
High Sheriffs of Carlow
Irish people with disabilities
19th-century Irish politicians
Irish chiefs of the name